The 2021–22 Scottish League Cup group stage was played from 9 July 2021 to 25 July 2021. A total of 40 teams competed in the group stage. The winners of each of the eight groups, as well as the three best runners-up progressed to the second round (last 16) of the 2021–22 Scottish League Cup.

Format
The group stage consists of eight groups of five teams. The five clubs competing in the UEFA Champions League (Rangers and Celtic), Europa League (St Johnstone) and Europa Conference League (Hibernian and Aberdeen) qualifying rounds are given a bye through to the second round. The 40 teams taking part in the group stage consist of the other seven teams that competed in the 2020–21 Scottish Premiership, and all of the teams that competed in the 2020–21 Scottish Championship, 2020–21 Scottish League One and 2020–21 Scottish League Two, as well as the 2020–21 Highland Football League champions and the 2020–21 Lowland Football League champions and runners-up.

The winners of each of the eight groups, as well as the three best runners-up, progress to the second round (last 16), which includes the five UEFA qualifying clubs. At this stage, the competition reverts to the traditional knock-out format. The three group winners with the highest points total and the clubs entering at this stage will be seeded, with the five group winners with the lowest points unseeded along with the three best runners-up.

The traditional point system of awarding three points for a win and one point for a draw is used, however, for each group stage match that finishes in a draw, a penalty shoot-out will take place, with the winner being awarded a bonus point.

The draw for the group stage took place on 28 May 2021 and was broadcast live on FreeSports & the SPFL YouTube channel.

Teams

North

Seeding
Teams in Bold qualified for the second round.

Source:

South

Seeding
Teams in Bold qualified for the second round.

Source:

North

Group A

Matches

Group B

Matches

Group C

Matches

Notes

Group D

Matches

South

Group E

Matches

Notes

Group F

Matches

Group G

Matches

Notes

Group H

Matches

Notes

Best runners-up

Qualified teams

Top goalscorers

Source:

References

Scottish League Cup group stages